Rolando Romero is an American professional boxer who held the WBA interim lightweight title from 2020 to 2021.

Professional career

Lightweight

Early career
Romero made his professional debut on December 2, 2016, scoring a first-round technical knockout (TKO) victory against David Courtney at the Sam's Town Hotel and Gambling Hall in Sunrise Manor, Nevada. Romero amassed an 8–0 record during the next three years, winning all but one of those fights by stoppage. Romero was next scheduled to face Andres Figueroa on April 20, 2019, on the undercard of the Danny Garcia and Adrián Granados welterweight bout. He won the fight by a fourth-round knockout. Romero had his first step-up in competition on November 1, 2019, when he faced Juan Carlos Cordones. He won the fight by a first-round knockout, stopping Cordones in the final minute of the opening round. Romero faced the undefeated Arturs Ahmetovs on February 22, 2020, on the undercard of Deontay Wilder and Tyson Fury II. He won the fight by a second-round technical knockout.

Romero vs. Maríñez, Sparrow
After compiling a record of 11–0 (10 KOs) Romero faced undefeated Dominican Jackson Maríñez for the vacant WBA interim lightweight title on August 15, 2020, at the Mohegan Sun Arena in Uncasville, Connecticut. Romero captured the vacant WBA interim title via twelve-round unanimous decision (UD) with the judges' scorecards reading 118–110, 116–112, and 115–113. This decision was considered very controversial, with the majority feeling Marinez earned the win.

Romero was scheduled to take on Justin Pauldo, but Pauldo came in 5Ibs over the contracted weight. Romero's team would then change the weight to 140 Ibs, but Pauldo failed a pre-fight physical with the commission having to cancel it. Romero fought Avery Sparrow as a last minute opponent, the latter having had five weeks of training prior to this fight. Romero defeated his opponent by seventh-round technical knockout, and aired his frustrations with Sparrow's fighting style after the fight: "He fought like a coward, he just wanted a street fight because he knew he wasn’t gonna do anything to me."

Romero vs. Yigit
Romero was slated to defend his interim title against Austin Dulay on the undercard of Jermell Charlo vs. Brian Castaño on July 17, 2021. Dulay pulled out of the fight a few days before the scheduled date which prompted Romero to claim that Dulay had pulled out of the fight due to a “panic attack.” Dulay responded by revealing that he suffered a knee injury and offered to give Romero $10,000 of his fight purse to reschedule the fight. Anthony Yigit was subsequently moved from his untelevised preliminary slot to step in as Romero's opponent. Romero's title was no longer on the line when Yigit weighed in 5.2 lbs over the 135 lb limit, but the fight nonetheless went ahead. On the night, Romero dropped Yigit multiple times en route to a seventh-round technical knockout victory. The San Antonio crowd booed Romero as he was announced as the winner, voicing their displeasure with his roughhouse tactics of throwing elbows, shoving and grappling his opponent. He was unfazed when questioned about it in his post-fight interview, saying, "I fought a 140 pounder and I fucking stopped him, simple as that."

Romero vs. Davis
On October 6, 2021, it was announced that Romero would be facing undefeated WBA (Regular) lightweight champion Gervonta Davis on December 5 at the Staples Center in Los Angeles on Showtime PPV. However, Romero was pulled from the bout due to sexual assault allegations made against him, and was subsequently replaced with Isaac Cruz. On January 11, 2022, Romero revealed on his Instagram page that no charges against him were filed, as the claims of sexual abuse could not be substantiated. On January 24, the WBA once again ordered Davis to make a mandatory lightweight title defense against Romero, and gave the pair until February 24 to come to terms. The pair agreed to face each other on May 28, in the main event of a Showtime PPV, at the Barclays Center in New York. Romero was knocked out in the 6th round.

Light welterweight

Romero vs. Puello
On February 8, 2023, it was reported that Romero would move up to light welterweight to challenge the WBA champion Alberto Puello. The championship bout is scheduled to take place on May 13, 2023, in the main event of a Showtime broadcast card.

Professional boxing record

References

External links

Living people
Year of birth missing (living people)
Date of birth missing (living people)
American boxers of Cuban descent
Sportspeople from Las Vegas
Boxers from Nevada
American male boxers
Lightweight boxers